It's a Wonderful Life  is a four-song Christmas extended play (EP) release by the alternative rock band Fishbone in 1987. The EP quickly went out of print, but its four songs were preserved on the 1996 retrospective Fishbone 101: Nuttasaurusmeg Fossil Fuelin' the Fonkay and the title track was featured on the 2003 greatest hits compilation album The Essential Fishbone.

Track listing

Personnel
Fishbone
Angelo Moore - saxophone, vocals
Walter A. Kibby II - trumpet, vocals
Kendall Jones - guitar
Chris Dowd - keyboard, trombone, vocals
John Norwood Fisher - bass guitar
Philip "Fish" Fisher - drums

References

Fishbone albums
1987 EPs
Albums produced by David Kahne
Christmas albums by American artists